The year 1553 CE in science and technology included a number of events, some of which are listed here.

Astronomy
 Leonard Digges publishes his popular English language ephemeris, A General Prognostication.

Cryptography
 'Vigenère cipher' first described by Giovan Battista Bellaso in his book La cifra del. Sig. Giovan Battista Bellaso (Venice).

Exploration
 May 10 – Sir Hugh Willoughby and Richard Chancellor set out from the River Thames to seek the Northeast Passage.
 August 14 – Willoughby sights what is probably Novaya Zemlya.
 August – Chancellor enters the White Sea and reaches Arkhangelsk.
 Naturalist Pierre Belon publishes  (Paris).

Physics
 Venetian mathematician Giambattista Benedetti publishes Resolutio omnium Euclidis problematum, proposing a new doctrine of the speed of bodies in free fall.

Physiology and medicine
 Michael Servetus publishes Christianismi Restitutio, including an account of the circulation of the blood.
 Publication in Spain of Libro del Exercicio, considered the first book on the benefits of physical exercise for health.

Births
 November 23 – Prospero Alpini, Italian physician and botanist (d. 1617)
 Robert Hues, English mathematician and geographer (d. 1632)
 Thomas Muffet, English naturalist and physician (d. 1604)
 Luca Valerio, Italian mathematician (d. 1618)

Deaths
 February 19 – Erasmus Reinhold, German astronomer and mathematician (b. 1511)
 August 8 – Girolamo Fracastoro, Italian physician (b. 1478)
 October 27 – Michael Servetus, Aragonese polymath (b. 1511) (executed for heresy)
 Pierre Desceliers, French cartographer and hydrographer (born c. 1500)

References

 
16th century in science
1550s in science